Robert of St. Albans (died 1187) was an English templar knight who converted to Islam from Christianity. In 1187, he led an army for Saladin against the Crusaders during the Battle of Hattin as well as the reconquest of Jerusalem, which was at the time under the control of the Franks. 

Robert eventually married the niece of Saladin, but was killed shortly after outside Jerusalem. 

Robert's conversion to Islam caused significant dismay among the Christians and sparked ill-will toward the Knights Templar in general.

See also
 List of converts to Islam

References

Converts to Islam from Christianity
Medieval Knights Templar members
Medieval English knights
1187 deaths
English Muslims
English former Christians
Year of birth unknown